Janet May Woollard (born 13 February 1955) is an Australian former politician who served as a member for the seat of Alfred Cove in the Western Australian Legislative Assembly from 2001 to 2013.

Woollard successfully contested the seat in the February 2001 state election as an Independent candidate (representing the Liberals for Forests party). She was re-elected at the 2005 election and again at the 2008 election.

In 2007 Woollard's son, Luke, crashed his family's boat whilst drink driving, seriously injuring a passenger. The injured passenger successfully sued Luke, who said he was unable to pay the 230,000 compensation and indicated he faced bankruptcy.  Woollard and her husband initially refused to pay the compensation on behalf of their son. However, they settled the case following intense media scrutiny.

Woollard was defeated in the 2013 state election, attracting only about 10% of the primary vote. The seat was won by the Liberal Party candidate, Dean Nalder.

See also
Members of the Western Australian Legislative Assembly, 2001-2005
Members of the Western Australian Legislative Assembly, 2005-2009

References

Parliamentary biographical entry
ABC 2005 election guide

1955 births
Living people
Independent members of the Parliament of Western Australia
Members of the Western Australian Legislative Assembly
21st-century Australian politicians
21st-century Australian women politicians
Women members of the Western Australian Legislative Assembly